Satra is a rural locality (a village) in Sermenevsky Selsoviet, Beloretsky District, Bashkortostan, Russia. The population was 19 as of 2010. There is 1 street.

Geography 
Satra is located 32 km west of Beloretsk (the district's administrative centre) by road. Yandek is the nearest rural locality.

References 

Rural localities in Beloretsky District